Gresya Amanda Maaliwuga (born 27 May 1995) is an Indonesian Ministry of Education and Culture Ambassador, Indonesian Ministry of Tourism Ambassador, actress, Presenter, TV commercial model and a beauty pageant titleholder who won the title of Puteri Indonesia Pariwisata 2015, She represented Indonesia at the Miss Supranational 2015 pageant and finished as Top 24 and won "Best National Costume" award, designed by Jember Fashion Carnaval. Gresya became the second Indonesian to be placed as a finalist in Miss Supranational history, after Cok Istri Krisnanda Widani placement in 2013.

Personal life and education

Gresya was born in Ternate, North Maluku, Indonesia, on 27 May 1995 to a traditional Minahasan family background. When at 7 her parents was divorced and she was raised by her maternal grandparents in Manado, North Sulawesi - Indonesia. She was finishing her secondary study in SMAN 1 Manado and holds a bachelor's degree on Business accounting and finance from TIE Eben Haezer in Manado, North Sulawesi, Indonesia.

on 2015-2016 She was part of The Puteri Indonesia Queens, batch 2015, since she was 15 Gresya work as a beauty influencer. Gresya is a child education advocate, she is helping to build a school and internet access especially those in rural area by working together with the Ministry of Education and Culture of The Republic of Indonesia and on 30 July 2016 Gresya was appointed as the Indonesian Ministry of Education and Culture Ambassador.

Pageantry

Puteri Indonesia 2015
Gresya stepping her foray into the field of pageantry by took part in Puteri Indonesia beauty pageant, representing North Sulawesi on Puteri Indonesia 2015, where she was crowned as Puteri Indonesia Pariwisata 2015 (Miss Supranational Indonesia 2015), at the grand finale held in Jakarta Convention Center, Jakarta, Indonesia on 20 February 2015, by the outgoing titleholder of Puteri Indonesia Pariwisata 2014, Lily Estelita Liana of Special Region of Yogyakarta. At the pageant she also gained a special award as "Puteri Indonesia of Sulawesi Islands".

Gresya crowned together with Puteri Indonesia; Anindya Kusuma Putri of Central Java, Puteri Indonesia Lingkungan; Chintya Fabyola of West Kalimantan, and Puteri Indonesia Perdamaian; Syarifah Olvah Bwefar Alhamid of West Papua.

Miss Supranational 2015
As Puteri Indonesia Pariwisata 2015, Gresya represented Indonesia at the 7th edition of the Miss Supranational pageant,  held in MOSIR (Hall of Sports), Krynica-Zdrój, Poland on 5 December 2015. She ended up placed in the Top 24  and won Best National Costume Awards at the pageant.

Gresya brought a national costume with the Torajan Tongkonan-inspired ensemble, Tongkonan is the traditional ancestral house, or Rumah adat of the Torajan people, in South Sulawesi, Indonesia. Tongkonan have a distinguishing boat-shaped and oversized saddleback roof. The costume named "Mystical Toraja" designed by Jember Fashion Carnival. Asha Bhat of India crowned Stephania Stegman of Paraguay as the new titleholder at the end of the event.

Filmography
Gresya has appeared on several movies. She has acted in a television film and cinema box-office film. She is also taking part as the presenter for musical show in Indosiar called Indonesian Dangdut Awards since 2017.

Movies

TV Shows

See also

 Puteri Indonesia 2015
 Miss Supranational 2015
 Anindya Kusuma Putri
 Chintya Fabyola
 Syarifah Olvah Bwefar Alhamid

References

External links
 Puteri Indonesia Official Website
 Official Miss Supranational Official Website
 Gresya Maaliwuga Official Instagram
 

Living people
1995 births
Puteri Indonesia contestants
Puteri Indonesia winners
Miss Supranational contestants
Indonesian beauty pageant winners
Indonesian Christians
Indonesian female models
Indonesian stage actresses
Indonesian film actresses
21st-century Indonesian actresses
Indonesian activists
Actresses from North Sulawesi
People from Manado
People from Ternate
Minahasa people